The Westmorland County Football Association is the governing body of football in the county of Westmorland.  The association was formed in 1897.

References

External links

County football associations
Sport in Westmorland
1897 establishments in England
Football in Cumbria
Sports organizations established in 1897